

Belgium
 Belgian Congo 
 Léon Pétillon, Governor-General of Belgian Congo (1952–1958)
 Henri Cornelis, Governor-General of Belgian Congo (1958–1960)

France
 French Somaliland – 
 Maurice Meker, Governor of French Somaliland (1957–1958)
 Jacques Marie Julien Compain, Governor of French Somaliland (1958–1962)
 Guinea –
 Jean Paul Ramadier, Governor of Guinea (1956–1958)
 Jean Mauberna, acting Governor of Guinea (1958)
 Independence, 2 October 1958

Portugal
 Angola – Horácio José de Sá Viana Rebelo, High Commissioner of Angola (1956–1960)

United Kingdom
 Aden – Sir William Henry Tucker Luce, Governor of Aden (1956–1960)
 Malta Colony – Sir Robert Laycock, Governor of Malta (1954–1959)
 Northern Rhodesia – Sir Arthur Benson, Governor of Northern Rhodesia (1954–1959)

Colonial governors
Colonial governors
1958